Nichioh Maru is a ro-ro car carrier built for the transport of Nissan cars and parts around Japan. The ship employs various features designed to promote energy efficiency, including solar power panels, an electronically controlled diesel engine, LED lighting in the ship's hold and living quarters, and low friction paint on its hull. According to its owners it will achieve a fuel reduction of up to nearly 1,400 tons annually, with an annual reduction of 4,200 tons of CO2 emissions.

See also
City of St. Petersburg, Nissan's international car carrier

References

2012 ships
Merchant ships of Japan
Ro-ro ships
Ships built in Japan